Fred Berthold (December 9, 1922 – September 18, 2019) was an American theologian, currently the Preston Kelsey Professor of Religion, Emeritus, at Dartmouth College, in Hanover, New Hampshire.

References

1922 births
2019 deaths
American theologians
Dartmouth College alumni
Dartmouth College faculty
People from Webster Groves, Missouri
University of Chicago alumni